The Women's Combined World Cup 1986 involved 4 events.

Standings
In Women's Combined World Cup 1985/86 the best 3 results count.

Team Results
All points were shown. bold indicate highest score - italics indicate race wins

References

External links
 

World Cup
FIS Alpine Ski World Cup women's combined discipline titles